Jim McCarthy may refer to:

 Jim McCarthy (businessman) (born 1956), British CEO of Poundland
 Jim McCarthy (comics), British comics creator and music journalist
 Jim McCarthy (rugby union) (1924–2015), Irish union player for Munster, the national team, and the Lions
 Jim McCarthy (author),  author and keynote speaker
 Jim McCarthy (hurler) (died 1982), Irish hurler
 Jim McCarthy (American football) (1920–1991), American football end
 Jim McCarthy, CEO and co-founder of web ticket seller Goldstar
 Jim McCarthy, singer-songwriter, member of The Godz
 Jim McCarthy, character in the 2010 film All Good Things

See also
 Jimmy MacCarthy (born 1953), Irish singer-songwriter
 James McCarthy (disambiguation)